Wieger Emile Mensonides (born 12 July 1938) is a former Dutch swimmer, who won the bronze medal in the 200 m breaststroke at the 1960 Summer Olympics. For forty years he was the only Dutch male swimmer to have won an Olympic medal. Pieter van den Hoogenband followed in his footsteps at the 2000 Summer Olympics in Sydney.

Between 1959 and 1967 he won 9 national titles and set 13 national records in the 100 m and 200 m breaststroke.

After his active sports career, Mensonides continued his involvement with the sport by training swimmers, and he developed a swim analysis method with corresponding software. He also has a swim analysis website showcasing the software together with a blog about all technical aspects of swimming and swim analysis.

References

1938 births
Living people
Dutch male breaststroke swimmers
Olympic swimmers of the Netherlands
Swimmers at the 1960 Summer Olympics
Swimmers at the 1964 Summer Olympics
Olympic bronze medalists for the Netherlands
Swimmers from The Hague
Olympic bronze medalists in swimming
Medalists at the 1960 Summer Olympics
European Aquatics Championships medalists in swimming